Murray Banks (1917-2008) was a clinical psychologist, and was formerly a full professor of psychology at Long Island University, and at Pace College, NYC, where he headed the psychology department for over five years. He was also a visiting professor and special lecturer on various subjects at the University at North Carolina, New York University, Temple University, New Jersey State Teachers College, University of Pittsburgh, and Brooklyn College.

Works

Comedy albums
 What YOU can learn from the Kinsey Report (Audio Masterworks, 1956)
 The Drama of Sex (1960)
 Just in case you think you're normal (1961)
 Dr. Murray Banks tells Jewish Stories Mit Psychology (1961)
 Dr. Murray Banks Tells more Jewish Stories Mit Psychology (1964)
 A Lesson in Love (1964)
 How to live with yourself...or what to do until psychiatrist comes (1965)
 How to quit smoking in six days or drop dead in seven (1965)
 Anyone who goes to a shrink should have their head examined (1971)

Books

References

1917 births
2008 deaths
20th-century American Jews
American male comedians
20th-century American comedians
Jewish male comedians
Brooklyn College faculty
21st-century American Jews
American psychologists